Mary Cockburn Mercer (1882–1963), was an Australian painter. She spent the 1920s and 1930s in Europe, and the 1940s in Melbourne, Australia. Her final years were spent in France. She exhibited with the Contemporary Art Society in Australia.

Biography 

Mercer was born in Almerston, Scotland on 19 April 1882. She spent her childhood in Victoria, Australia. After WWI Mercer arrived in the Montparnasse section of Paris, where she became acquainted with Pablo Picasso, Marc Chagall, Marie Laurencin, Jules Pascin and Kees van Dongen. She eventually left Paris to live in other parts of France, Italy, Spain, and Tahiti.

In 1938 Mercer returned to Australia, settling in Melbourne. There she associated with George Bell, William Frater, Lina Bryans and Arnold Shore. She also renewed her friendship with Janet Cumbrae Stewart, who she previously met in Paris in the 1920s. While in Melbourne, Mercer took art classes from George Bell and later taught at her private studio, where her students included Colin McCahon, Cumbrae Stewart and Lina Bryans.

In the 1940s Mercer exhibited at the Contemporary Art Society in Melbourne.

In 1953 Mercer returned to France and died there on 14 August 1963.

Legacy 

In 2017-2018 Mercer was included in the Australian National Trust show Intrepid Women – Australian women artists in Paris 1900-1950.

References

External links 

 images of Mary Cockburn Mercer's work at the National Gallery of Victoria

1882 births
1963 deaths
20th-century Australian women artists
Australian expatriates in France
Scottish emigrants to colonial Australia
20th-century Australian painters